Karl E J Barton (born 17 July 1937) is a British former cyclist. He competed at the 1960 Summer Olympics and the 1964 Summer Olympics. He also represented England and won a silver medal in the Track 1,000m Match Sprint at the 1958 British Empire and Commonwealth Games in Cardiff, Wales. Four years later he won another silver medal in the Track 1,000m Match Sprint at the 1962 British Empire and Commonwealth Games in Perth, Western Australia.

Barton was a three times British track champion, winning the British National Individual Sprint Championships in 1962, 1963 and 1964.

References

External links
 

1937 births
Living people
British male cyclists
Olympic cyclists of Great Britain
Cyclists at the 1960 Summer Olympics
Cyclists at the 1964 Summer Olympics
Sportspeople from Birmingham, West Midlands
Commonwealth Games medallists in cycling
Commonwealth Games silver medallists for England
Cyclists at the 1958 British Empire and Commonwealth Games
Cyclists at the 1962 British Empire and Commonwealth Games
20th-century British people
Medallists at the 1958 British Empire and Commonwealth Games
Medallists at the 1962 British Empire and Commonwealth Games